Blue Boys is a Namibian football (soccer) club from Swakopmund. They play in the country's highest division, the Namibia Premier League.

The team was founded in 1958.

Stadium
Currently the team plays at the 2000 capacity Vineta Central Sport Grounds.

External links
Web site
Soccerway

Football clubs in Namibia
Association football clubs established in 1958
1958 establishments in South West Africa